The Adventures of Dean Martin and Jerry Lewis is the title of a  celebrity comic book published by DC Comics and featuring the popular team of comedians Dean Martin and Jerry Lewis. The series ran for forty issues from 1952 through 1957, at which time the title was renamed The Adventures of Jerry Lewis due to the real life breakup of the team. 

The series continued as a Jerry Lewis solo title for issues #41-124. The new series featured Lewis in a variety of humorous situations. Infrequent guest stars included Batman, Bob Hope, Lex Luthor, Superman, the Flash, and Wonder Woman. Notable artists who worked on the series include Bob Oksner and Neal Adams.

In 1964, Jerry's genius nephew Renfrew joined the book, and a year later, the cast included a fairy-tale witch housekeeper named Witch Kraft.

The entire DC humor line was cancelled between 1971 and 1972, including Jerry Lewis, Leave It to Binky, Date with Debbi and Swing with Scooter.

In 2007, Bob Oksner stated that he had had a greater role in writing the comic than previously acknowledged, explaining that the comic's editor, Larry Nadle, had persuaded Oksner to allow his writing credit (and thus payment) to be transferred to "another cartoonist" who Nadle described as being in debt to DC; in reality, Nadle was keeping the money. When this was discovered after Nadle's death in 1963, Oksner was nearly fired.

See also
 The Adventures of Alan Ladd
 The Adventures of Bob Hope

References

Martin and Lewis
Martin and Lewis
Comics by Arnold Drake
Comics by Neal Adams
Defunct American comics
Jerry Lewis
American comics
Humor comics
1952 comics debuts
Comics characters introduced in 1952
1957 comics endings